Spybot may refer to:

 Spybot – Search & Destroy, a spyware and adware removal computer program
 Spybot worm, a family of computer worms